South West Mutton Bird Islet is a dome-shaped unpopulated islet located close to the south-western coast of Tasmania, Australia. The South West Mutton Bird Islet is part of the Southwest National Park and the Tasmanian Wilderness World Heritage Site.

Fauna
The islet is part of the Port Davey Islands Important Bird Area, so identified by BirdLife International because of its importance for breeding seabirds. Recorded breeding seabird species are the short-tailed shearwater, (1000 pairs) and fairy prion (200 pairs).

See also

 List of islands of Tasmania

References

Islands of Tasmania
Protected areas of Tasmania
Important Bird Areas of Tasmania
Tasmanian Wilderness World Heritage Area